In the United States, the introduction of new styles of music came during the Transatlantic Slave Trade era. The genres of music include, but are not limited to, blues, rock, gospel music, jazz, and bluegrass. Black American women in the music industry have made significant contributions over the years.

This legacy starts in the 1870s with the Fisk Jubilee Singers, who performed many different genres of black music including traditional spirituals, blues, classic jazz and rhythm and blues, also commonly referred to as R&B. The Fisk Jubilee Singers became popular throughout the world for singing traditional spirituals during their tours in both the United States and England. Sexist attitudes during the early 20th century made it difficult for African-American women to have a strong presence in mainstream music. Despite this, women were still extremely authoritative in the genres of blues, jazz, and R&B.

Early Music and the Harlem Renaissance

Jazz 
African-American women contributed to the genre as both jazz singers and instrumentalists, although the genre was dominated by men. The piano was one of the first instruments that women played in jazz music, and this ability granted women a great degree of acceptance in the industry. 

Mary Lou Williams, a popular pianist, is sometimes referred to as one of America's best known and revered jazz women. Williams gained her first spot light in her hometown, Kansas City, where she developed into one of the most "sought after pianists in Kansas City". Through her compositions, Williams is said to have influenced the evolution of the "big band" sound. Because of her innovative writing techniques, Williams gained the opportunity to compose for many well known jazz innovators such as Louis Armstrong, and Duke Ellington. Williams did not move into the New York Area until the early 1940s. It was during this time that a new style, "bebop", was emerging, and she easily transitioned into composing music for this subgenre of jazz. She later went on to lead various women's music groups, and founded one of the first female-owned recording companies.

Due to the treatment of women, most could not make it in the industry as individual performers, but all-female jazz bands and family-based jazz groups were popular. During World War II, many male jazz musicians were drafted to fight in the war; because of this, all-female bands had the opportunity to gain popularity. Some of these bands included Darlings of Rhythm and the International Sweethearts of Rhythm.

In later years, African-American women were able to succeed as individual singers. Some of the most successful names include Ella Fitzgerald, Dinah Washington, Lena Horne, and Billie Holiday. Ella Fitzgerald, known as "The First Lady of Song", sold over 40 million records and won 13 Grammy Awards.

Blues 
The 1920s blues, known as the classic blues, was a genre largely popularized by African-American women. Singers such as Ma Rainey, Bessie Smith, Alberta Hunter, and Ethel Waters were the most popular.[2] Ma Rainey, referred to as the "Mother of the Blues", became popular in the early 1900s. Rainey was the first popular black female stage entertainer to incorporate authentic blues into her song selection. She is known for the "Jump Blues" which incorporated a racy and theatrical style, whereas Bessie Smith, who was known as the "empress of the blues" showcased the classic blues.

As male-dominated country blues grew in popularity women fell out of the spotlight. During the blues revival, about 30 years later, Mamie Smith became the first black female vocalist to record a blues song. While "Crazy Blues" is cited as the first blues recording, it also represents the emergence of black female singers into popular music culture. Both black and white consumers purchased the record, and record company executives recognized it as a lucrative marketing segment.

R&B and its descendants

R&B 
Soul and R&B have their roots in the civil rights movement of the 1960s. These genres focused on breaking down the barriers between black and white Americans. Most of the singers in this genre had Southern roots and sang in their churches. Artists in this genre include Sister Rosetta Tharpe and Bessie Smith, with the most well-known being Aretha Franklin. Aretha Franklin gained prominence in the 1960s. Franklin signed her record deal at the age of eighteen after singing at her church in Detroit. She was most successful working with artists whose background stemmed from gospel music. She chose to follow this path and reinvented herself landing five number one hits and a Grammy. In 1967 and 1968, Franklin reached commercial success, recording more than a dozen million-selling singles. Mahalia Jackson was another female artist known as the "Queen of Gospel" who had an impact on the civil rights movement with her songs. Aretha Franklin covered one of her more popular songs, "How I Got Over". It was a more upbeat version with James Cleveland and The Southern California Community Choir.
Both Aretha Franklin and Mahalia Jackson had major songs during the civil rights movement: Franklin's version of Otis Redding's "Respect" and Jackson's "I've Been 'Buked and I've Been Scorned", which she performed at the march on Washington after being asked by Dr. Martin Luther King Jr.
Despite their role in popularizing black music and culture, few black women are recognized in the emergence of rap and hip-hop culture in the 1970s-1980s.

Rap 

A version of hip hop emerged in the 1990s that transformed the upbeat music of earlier decades into a genre that glorified the violent lifestyle of America's inner cities, often romanticizing poverty, drug use, drug dealing and gang violence. This genre of music has been criticized for sexually objectifying not only women of color but all women. The language used in modern rap music has been criticized for being demeaning to women, in particular for the prevalence of slang terms such as "bitch," "hoe," "slut," or "thot".

Hip-Hop Feminism 

Hip-Hop Feminism has its roots in attempts to reclaim the positive position of black women in the music industry. It is concerned with how the conservative backlash of the 1980s and 1990s deindustrialization, the slashing of the welfare state, and the attendant gutting of social programs and affirmative action along with the increasing racial wealth gap, have affected the lived worlds and world views of the hip-hop generation. Hip-hop feminism also aims at reclaiming the sexualization of black women as pleasurable and consensual. 

Some notable artists include Me’Shell Ndegeocello and Angie Stone.

Hip-hop feminism has had a political impact with regards to the rights of women, African Americans, and the LGBTQ community. Because of this, hip-hop feminism has been largely shaped by a sociopolitical agenda. This has created a second and third wave of black American feminist artists, both of whom share a different argument through their songs. However, there are theoretical and practical linkages between the generations and their music.

One aspect of hip-hop feminism is its use of "the politics of respectability", a term coined by Evelyn Brooks Higginbotham, which describes several strategies for progressive black female artists to more effectively promote a message of racial uplift and women's rights to a bigger audience. These methods largely regard notions of self-respect, honor, piety, and propriety. Respectability politics has been a useful way of improving conditions for African-Americans, by providing black female artists with a platform to talk about the de jure and de facto racist and misogynistic practices they experience.

More recently there has been an emergence of queer feminists of color in hip-hop. One example of this is Me’Shell Ndegeocello, who made her debut in 1993. In her lyrics, Ndegeocello brings awareness to the realities that the black community faces, such as abortion, low-income housing, and unfair US beauty standards. Ndegeocello's lyrics further explore her queer identity in desires in songs like "Mary Magdalene" and "Pocketbook".

Through hip-hop soul women created an aesthetic that represented and engaged politics of sexuality and gender in working-class black communities. By allowing women in hip-hop soul to offer narratives that highlighted their multidimensional nature, they offered experiences other black women could relate to. The shift from male-dominated hip-hop to women-centered as well as women-told hip-hop soul highlights the shift in previous perceptions of women within hip-hop culture.

Rapper and actress Queen Latifah made history when she won a Grammy for her groundbreaking hit, "U.N.I.T.Y.," in 1995. The song spoke out against domestic violence and the objectification of black female sexuality. "U.N.I.T.Y." began a conversation in the African American community over violence and assault against women. It also established that black women rappers had a powerful voice in a field dominated by men.

Contemporary Music Industry 

Today, female rappers are using rap lyrics to define an independent Black female identity. Examples include Queen Latifah, Salt 'N' Pepa, MC Lyte and Eve, who criticize men who abuse and manipulate women. Other women (Beyoncé, Lauryn Hill, Rihanna, Nicki Minaj, Alicia Keys, Kehlani, Mariah Carey, Janet Jackson and Zap Mama) use hip-hop as a platform to empower black women and other minorities around the world. 

Queen Latifah is one of the biggest influences in the music industry. She released her album, All Hail the Queen at a young age. The album had feminist themes that attracted a wide audience. Queen Latifah promoted women's importance, demanding equal treatment of women and the importance of women supporting each other. She was the first female MC to ever go gold which paved the way for other women rappers. Black Reign was her most popular album and included her biggest single, U.N.I.T.Y, which won a Grammy for Best Solo Rap Performance.

Beyoncé Knowles has won the most Grammys of all time by a singer with 28 Grammys, and is the only artist in history to have all of her seven studio albums reach the top of Billboard's album charts. Knowles most recent work, Lemonade, contends with the issues black women face while living in America. For example, the song "Freedom" "which talks about blackness in America, includes amazing visuals of various fierce black women who proudly rock picked-out afros and other dynamic hairstyles in scenes that reflect and reaffirm black beauty". The visual for "Freedom" contains powerful, moving images of black women who have lost black men in their lives, including Gwen Carr, Sybrina Fulton, and Lezley McSpadden, whom are the mothers of Eric Garner, Trayvon Martin, and Michael Brown, respectively.

Sylvia Rhone, who is now CEO of Epic Records, has been a pioneer in the music business for decades. She began her career in the music industry with Buddha Records in 1974, and went on to spend time at ABC Records, Ariola Records, Elektra, Atlantic Records, and finally Epic Records. Rhone has gone on to discover and mentor several renowned current artist including DJ Khaled, 21 Savage, Camila Cabello, Travis Scott, Future, Meghan Trainor, French Montana, and many more.

Influence of Music Videos 
Studies have shown that Black women are underrepresented in hip-hop and rap music videos. When black women are represented, it is often in a way that reinforces stereotypical gender roles; specifically, women are more likely to be shown in submissive positions to men.

Black women are also heavily sexualized in hip-hop and rap music videos. They are referred to as video "thots","hoes" or "vixens". They are often wearing revealing clothing, like lingerie or swimsuits. Many scholars have argued that women are sexualized in these videos to enhance the hyper-masculinity of the featured male rappers.

When Black females perform in music videos, they are typically seen in the Eurocentric form of beauty: lighter skinned and thin. This specific image is what rap and R&B music videos are looking for, including those that portray black females as main or background characters. In 2004, women at Spelman College protested a bone-marrow drive sponsored by Nelly over the visuals in his latest music video Tip Drill. The video featured dozens of women dancing in thong bikinis dancing around a swimming pool and on men. The scene that has caused the most uproar is a visual of Nelly swiping a credit card through a woman's buttocks. Even 15 years later, the producer of the video, Kareem johnson, defends the video and the credit card scene specifically stating "If the girls weren’t in the video, this wouldn’t be a conversation. They were willing participants. That’s the part that was missed. The model never requested the scene to be edited. If Nelly has to be held accountable, so does the model. Responsibility needs to be shared."

References

 
Music history
History of women in the United States